Choi Dong-hoon (born January 31, 1983), better known by the stage name Primary, is a South Korean hip hop musician and record producer. Formerly an artist under Amoeba Culture, he established his own record label PAKTORY Company on April 22, 2020.

Primary has collaborated with various artists to produce the albums Back Again, Primary Score, Daily Apartment, Primary and The Messengers, and 2. He has also produced albums for other Korean hip hop artists, including Supreme Team's first album Supremier and Dynamic Duo's Kill, as well as several of MBLAQ's singles, including "I'm Back" and "Smokey Girl". He appeared in the MBC variety program Infinite Challenge in 2013.

Career 
Primary became active in the South Korean hip hop scene in 2004 with collaborations with Dynamic Duo and Garion. He also gained musical experience while attending Seoul Jazz Academy. In 2006, he debuted with an album named Daily Apartment in collaboration with Beenzino, under the name P' Skool. As part of the promotions for the album, Primary donned a cardboard box mask with a bird beak in order to be more memorable. The band is now inactive, but often play at live performances for Dynamic Duo and Supreme Team.

Primary and Dynamic Duo's Gaeko created a track for Quincy Jones's 2011 visit to Korea which Jones sung at a press conference and expressed his appreciation for. In 2011 Primary released the first part of the album Primary and The Messengers and continued to release the subsequent four parts through October 2012. The album in total includes collaborations with 23 separate artists. He successfully broke into the top ten on various Korean music charts with the album's track "? (Question Mark)" in November 2012. Primary performed a special stage with Dynamic Duo at the 2012 MBC Gayo Daejun.

On August 31 and September 1, 2013, Primary held a sold-out joint concert with Zion.T at the Lotte Art Center in Seoul. Primary also participated at the 2013 Infinite Challenge Song Festival, performing with Park Myeong-su and producing a song for Park Ji-yoon. The songs he made for the event, "I Got C" and "Mr. Lee". were later have found to have crossed the line from sampling into plagiarism in their use of Dutch artist Caro Emerald's songs "Liquid Lunch" and "One Day". Primary later officially credited Caro Emerald's composing group Grandmono for the songs. All of the proceeds from the song "I Got C" were later donated. Primary later produced the song "Without You" for Infinite H.

On March 24, 2020, Amoeba Culture announced that their exclusive contract with Primary had been terminated.

On April 22, 2020, he established his own record label PAKTORY Company.

Discography

Studio albums

Extended plays

Singles

Other charted songs

Notes

References

South Korean record producers
South Korean hip hop record producers
South Korean male rappers
1983 births
Living people